Gasthof zum Bären is a traditional inn in Trubschachen village, Bern canton, Switzerland, first written record about it is from 1356.

The official inn working (Tavernenrecht) started in 1569 and today it is a popular meeting point of the folk culture.

See also 
List of oldest companies

References

External links 
Homepage in German
On the list of cultural objects in Trubschachen
Note on German Wikipedia

Hotels in Switzerland
Restaurants in Switzerland
Companies established in the 14th century
14th-century establishments in Switzerland